The Royal Saudi Air Force (RSAF) is the aviation branch of the Saudi Arabian Armed Forces.

The Royal Saudi Air Force currently has approximately 1,106 aircraft, 40,000 active personnel, 23,000 recruits, 9 wings, +99 squadrons, and a Special Forces unit dedicated to combat search and rescue.

The RSAF has developed from a largely defensive military force into one with an advanced offensive capability, and maintains the third largest fleet of F-15s after the U.S. and Japanese air forces.

The backbone of the RSAF is currently the Boeing F-15 Eagle, with the Panavia Tornado also forming a major component. The Tornado and many other aircraft were delivered under the Al Yamamah contracts with British Aerospace (now BAE Systems).

The RSAF ordered various weapons in the 1990s, including Sea Eagle anti-ship missiles, laser-guided bombs and gravity bombs. Al-Salam, a successor to the Al Yamamah agreement will see 48 Eurofighter Typhoons delivered by BAE.

History
 The RSAF was formed in the mid-1920s with British assistance from the remains of the Hejaz Air Force. It was initially equipped with Westland Wapiti IIA general purpose aircraft flown by pilots who had served Ali of Hejaz but had been pardoned by the Saudi king. It was re-organized in 1950 and began to receive American assistance from 1952 including the use of Dhahran Airfield by the United States Air Force.

Early aircraft used by the RSAF included the Caproni Ca.100, Albatros D.III, Armstrong Whitworth F.K.8, Farman MF.11 Airco DH.9, dH 82 Tiger Moth, Westland Wapiti, Avro Anson, Douglas C-47, and the B-26 Invader.

As part of the Magic Carpet arms deal between the United Kingdom and the Kingdom of Saudi Arabia, four single-seat Hawker Hunter F.6s and two Hunter T.7s were ordered from Hawker in 1966. The aircraft were delivered to No. 6 Squadron at Khamis Mushayt Airbase in May 1966. Although the Hunters were operational following attacks on Saudi Arabia by the Egyptian Air Force they were not a success as interceptors as they lacked any ground control but were used for ground attack. One single-seat aircraft was lost in 1967 and the remaining aircraft were presented to Jordan in 1968.

The Saudi forces are equipped with mainly western equipment. Main suppliers to the RSAF are companies based in the United Kingdom and the United States. Both the UK and the US are involved in training programs conducted in Saudi Arabia.

During the 1980s and 1990s, by Middle Eastern standards the armed forces of Saudi Arabia were relatively small. Its strength however was derived from advanced technology. The backbone of the strike / ground attack force is formed by ca 70 Tornados (a second batch of 48 Tornado IDS were ordered in 1993 under the al-Yamamah II program), and 72 F-15S aircraft delivered from the mid-1990s that operate beside the remnants of more than 120 F-15C/D aircraft delivered starting in 1981. Pilot training is executed on the Pilatus PC-21 and BAe Hawk. The C-130 Hercules is the mainstay of the transport fleet and the Hercules is assisted by CN-235s and Raytheon King Air 350 light transports. Reconnaissance is performed by Tornadoes and F-15s equipped with the DJRP electro-optical reconnaissance pod. The Boeing E-3A is the Airborne Early Warning platform operated by No. 18 Squadron RSAF.

The VIP support fleet consists of a wide variety of civil registered aircraft such as the Airbus A330, Airbus A320, 737 and 747, Lockheed Tri-Stars, MD11s and G1159A as well as Lockheed L-100-30. The HZ- prefix used in the civilian registrations of these aircraft derived from the former name of the territory (Hejaz).

From 1989 to 1991 three Lockheed C-130 Hercules of the RSAF were destroyed in accidents.

Purchases during the 2000s
The Al Yamamah contract was controversial because of the alleged bribes associated with its award. Nonetheless, the RSAF announced its intention to purchase the Typhoon from BAE Systems in December 2005. On 18 August 2006, a memorandum of understanding was signed for 72 aircraft in a GB£6–10 billion deal.

Following this order, the investigation of the Al Yamamah contract was suppressed by the British prime minister Tony Blair in December 2006, citing "strategic interests" of the UK. On 17 September 2007 Saudi Arabia announced it had signed a £4.4bn deal with BAE Systems for 72 Typhoons.

On 29 December 2011, the United States signed a $29.4 billion deal to sell 84 F-15s in the SA (Saudi Advanced) configuration. The sale includes upgrades for the older F-15s up to the SA standard and related equipment and services.

On 23 May 2012, the British defence firm BAE Systems agreed to sell 22 BAE Hawk advanced jet trainer aircraft to the Royal Saudi Air Force for a total of £1.9 billion ($3 billion). The deal also included simulators, ground and training equipment and spares. In April 2013, BAE Systems delivered the first two new Typhoons of 24 to Saudi Arabia.

In 2013, the USAF tendered an offer for security services to protect the Saudi air force from cyberwarfare attacks.

In March 2021, RSAF started a joint military exercise, that will last until April 10, with the US and Pakistani Air Forces that will help in exchanging experiences and expertise.

Structure
The RSAF is divided into nine Wings that are dispersed across seven Air Bases:
 RSAF Wing 1 at King Khalid Air Base, Khamis Mushait
 RSAF Wing 2 at King Fahad Air Base, Taif. Listed by scramble.nl in mid-2020 as including Nos 3, 5, No. 10, 14, 34, and 80 Squadrons; plus an AB212 detachment of 12 Squadron.
 RSAF Wing 3 at King Abdulaziz Air Base, Dhahran
 RSAF Wing 4 at King Saud Air Base, King Khalid Military City
 RSAF Wing 5 at King Khalid Air Base, Khamis Mushait. Listed by scramble.nl in mid-2020 as including Nos 6, 99, 202, and 203 Squadrons; plus 55 Squadron, the F-15 FTU, and a detachment of 14 Squadron.
 RSAF Wing 6 at Prince Sultan Air Base, Al Kharj
 RSAF Wing 7 at King Faisal Air Base, Tabuk. Listed by scramble.nl in mid-2020 as including Nos 2, 21, 29, 37, 79 Squadrons; plus 88 Squadron, the "Saudi Falcons" aerobatic team. 
 RSAF Wing 8 at King Abdullah Air Base, Jeddah
 RSAF Wing 11 at King Abdulaziz Air Base, Dhahran

Squadrons 

 1 Squadron (Royal Flight/BBJ&HS125)
 2 Squadron (F-15C And F-15D) - previously English Electric Lightning at Tabuk, up until at least 1985.
 3 Squadron (Eurofighter Typhoon)
 4 Squadron (C-130)
 5 Squadron (F-15C And F-15D)
 6 Squadron (F-15SA) 
 7 Squadron (Tornado IDS)
 8 Squadron (Cirrus SR22)
 9 Squadron (PC-21)
 10 Squadron (Eurofighter Typhoon)
 11 Squadron (Royal Flight/G-IV&CE550)
 12 Squadron (Bell 212)
 13 Squadron (F-15C And F-15D) - previously English Electric Lightning.
 14 Squadron (Helicopters)
 15 Squadron (OUT SERVICE)
 16 Squadron (C-130)
 18 Squadron (E-3)
 19 Squadron (RE-3A)
 21 Squadron (BAE Hawk)
 22 Squadron (PC-21)
 23 Squadron (KE-3)
 24 Squadron (A330 MRTT)
 25 Squadron (Bell 412)
 29 Squadron (Tornado ADV to be replaced with the F-15SA)
 30 Squadron (Helicopters)
 32 Squadron (KC-130H And KC-130J)
 33 Squadron (Royal Medical Flight)
 34 Squadron (F-15C And F-15D)
 35 Squadron (Jetstream)
 37 Squadron (BAE HAWK)
 41 Squadron (King Air 350 Aerial Reconnaissance)
 42 Squadron (F-15C AND F-15D)
 44 Squadron (Bell 412)
 55 Squadron (F-15SA)
 66 Squadron (Tornado IDS)
 75 Squadron (Tornado IDS)
 79 Squadron (BAE Hawk)
 80 Squadron (Eurofighter Typhoon)
 83 Squadron (Tornado IDS)
 88 Squadron (Hawk)
 92 Squadron (F-15S)
 99 Squadron (Cougar)

Equipment

Aircraft

Retired 

Previous aircraft flown by the Royal Saudi Air Force included the F-86F Sabre, dH 100 Vampire FB.52, BAC Strikemaster Mk 80, DHC-1 Chipmunk Mk 10, C-54A Skymaster, C-123B Provider, T-6A Texan, T-33A Shooting Star, Cessna 310, O-1 Bird Dog, T-35A Buckaroo, T-34A Mentor, OH-58A Kiowa, T-28A Trojan, F-5 Tiger II, Lockheed JetStar, dH Comet 4C (VIP transport), BAe 146, Alouette III,  BAC Lightning F.52, F53 and T.55

Drones

Saudi Arabia is one of the largest countries that owns unmanned aerial vehicles, including attack, surveillance, and reconnaissance. In 2012, Saudi Arabia purchased 50 Italian Selex Galileo Falco drones. In 2014, Saudi Arabia signed a contract with China to purchase Chengdu and Wing Loong drones, and Saudi Arabia has more to receive so far. In April 2013, Saudi Arabia announced its desire to buy 6 Turkish TAI Anka drones. However these efforts fell through. Saudi Arabia has pursued projects to manufacture national drones, the first of which was in 2012, when Saudi Arabia announced a program to manufacture drones in the King Abdulaziz City for Science and Technology, and the project was called Saqr, and 3 new models of the drone have been introduced. Saudi Arabia also announced a new drone called Samoom, the Saudi crown prince and the Egyptian President Abdul-Fattah As-Sisi stood in front of it while president Abdul-Fattah Al-Sisi showed interest in it. Saudi Arabia also announced lately that it will start producing the high capability drone called SkyGuard. And it also established a laboratory for robotic vehicle research at the Prince Sultan Institute for Advanced Technology Research at King Saud University. The laboratory aims to build and transfer technology in the field of smart vehicles of all kinds, such as unmanned aircraft, autonomous land vehicles, and others. The laboratory has manufactured many unmanned aircraft, and the aircraft are still undergoing research and development. Saudi Arabia has started technology transfer projects and joint ventures with countries to manufacture drones. The General organization for Military Industries obtained a license to manufacture the German plane "Luna", and Saudi Arabia has manufactured hundreds of them and serve in the Saudi armed forces. Saudi Arabia entered into a joint venture with South Africa to manufacture the Seker 400 armed aircraft.

Commanders 
The following officers have been commanders of the RSAF:

 Captain Abdullah al-Mandili
 Major Rashid al-Saleh
 Major Gen. Ibrahim al-Tassan (1950–1966)
 Major Gen. Hashim bin Said Hashim (1966–1972)
 Lt. Gen. Asaad al-Zuhair (1972–1980)
 Lt. Gen. Mohammed Sabri Suleiman (1980–1984)
 Lt. Gen. Abdullah bin AbdulAziz al-Hamdan (1984–1987)
Lt. Gen. Ahmed Ibrahim Behery (1987 – March 1996)
Lt. Gen. Abdul Aziz bin Mohammad Al-Henadi (March 1996 – 4 April 2004)
Lt. Gen. Prince Abdulrahman Al-Faisal (4 April 2004 – 16 June 2010)
Lt. Gen. Mohammed Al-Ayesh (16 June 2010 – 10 May 2013)
Lt. Gen. Fayyadh Al Ruwaili (10 May 2013 – 14 May 2014)
 Lt. Gen. Muhammad Al Shaalan (14 May 2014 – 10 June 2015)
 Major Gen. Mohammed al-Otaibi (10 June 2015 – 26 February 2018)
 Lt. Gen. Turki bin Bandar (26 February 2018 – present)

See also
 Royal Saudi Air Force Museum
 Saudi ranks
  Prince Sultan Advanced Technology Research Institute (معهد الأمير سلطان لأبحاث التقنيات المتقدمة), a Defense research and development center established by Royal Saudi Air Force and King Saud University.

References

External links 

 
 Order of Battle at Scramble magazine
 "The Royal Saudi Air Force – A Paper Tiger, Minus the Tiger"

 
Air force
20th century in Saudi Arabia
1920s establishments in Saudi Arabia
Military units and formations established in 1916
1916 establishments in Asia
Air forces by country